The Airborne Fun is a series of Australian high-wing, single and two-place, hang gliders, designed and produced by Airborne Windsports of Redhead, New South Wales and introduced in the early 2000s.

Design and development
The Fun series are all intended to be beginner hang gliders used for recreational flying and flight training.

The Fun 190 model is made from aluminum tubing, with the single-surface wing covered in Dacron sailcloth. Its  span wing is cable braced with a single kingpost supporting the ground wires. The nose angle is 118° and the aspect ratio is 5.51:1. The aircraft is certified as DHV 1.

Variants
Fun 160
Fun 190
Fun 220
Fun 2
Improved model

Specifications (Fun 220)

References

External links

Airborne Fun series official photo gallery

Hang gliders